Mokra  is a village in the administrative district of Gmina Miedźno, within Kłobuck County, Silesian Voivodeship, in southern Poland. The village has a population of 796.

On September 1, 1939, it was the site of the Battle of Mokra, fought between the Polish cavalry brigade and a German panzer division. The one-day battle was won by the Poles.

References

Mokra